Sergio Gómez Barrio (born 16 October 1970) is a Spanish former professional tennis player.

Born in Marbella, Gómez Barrio competed on the professional tour in the 1990s and reached a career high singles world ranking of 334. He qualified for the main draw of two ATP Tour tournaments, the Suisse Open in 1993 and the Marbella Open in 1997. His career also included qualifying draw appearances at the US Open and Wimbledon.

Gómez Barrio is director of the Bel-Air Tennis Club in Málaga.

References

External links
 
 

1970 births
Living people
Spanish male tennis players
Tennis players from Andalusia
People from Marbella
Sportspeople from the Province of Málaga